The Export Land Model, or Export-Land Model, refers to work done by Dallas geologist Jeffrey Brown, building on the work of others, and discussed widely on The Oil Drum.  It models the decline in oil exports that result when an exporting nation experiences both a peak in oil production and an increase in domestic oil consumption.  In such cases, exports decline at a far faster rate than the decline in oil production alone.

The Export Land Model is important to petroleum importing nations because when the rate of global petroleum production peaks and begins to decline, the petroleum available on the world market will decline much more steeply than the decline in total production.

Theory 

As world oil exports approach (or pass) a global peak, the price of exported oil increases and further stimulates domestic economic growth and oil consumption in Export-Land countries, creating a positive feedback process between declining exports and higher prices.  Eventually, however, the level of export decline outpaces the increasing oil price, slowing domestic growth.  In some cases, an Export Land eventually becomes a net importer.  It is unlikely that an Export Land would constrain domestic consumption to help importing countries.  In fact, many oil exporting countries subsidize domestic consumption below price levels defined by the world market.

Hypothetical example 
Given a hypothetical oil producing country (known by the model as an Export Land) that produces , consumes , and exports  to oil consuming countries around the world, the model would be applied as such (illustrated in the graph above):
Export Land hits the point of Peak Oil production, and over a five-year period production drops by 25%.   Over the same time period, Export Land's consumption increases by 20% to 1.2 mbpd.  This causes Export Land's net exports over the five-year period to fall from 1 mbpd to 0.3 mbpd, a decrease of 70% -- resulting from a combination of increasing domestic consumption in Export Land and a 25% drop in production.  Counter-intuitively, the fractional decline in exports is much greater than the sum of the fractional increase in domestic consumption and the fractional decline in production.

Real-world examples 

Several real-world nations exhibit the characteristics of the Export Land Model as pictured in the image gallery above.  These four nations exhibit increasing domestic consumption along with declining production.  Indonesia has already shifted from oil exporter to oil importer while Egypt is hovering on the brink.  Malaysia and Mexico also have the hallmarks of the Export Land Model.

Within 5 years, Mexico (the second biggest exporter of oil to the US) may become a net oil importer.  Other nations where this may soon happen include Iran, Algeria and Malaysia.

A recent report from CIBC World Markets also indicates that as much as 40% of Saudi Arabia's expected production increases will be offset by rising internal demand by 2010, and Iranian exports will decline by more than 50% for similar reasons.

Nations may also reach their peak of oil production without fitting the Export Land model.  For example, the United Kingdom began importing oil in 2006, after decades of exporting, due to declining production.  But as domestic consumption in the UK has remained essentially unchanged for the last 20 years, their rising import levels essentially match their falling production levels.  Similarly, Norway's exports began declining in 2001, but at the same rate as their production because their domestic consumption was also not growing.  Unlike many exporters, these two countries don't subsidize local market oil price and have high fuel prices by world standards, thus one of the premises of the export land model (that domestic consumption should not be affected by world market price) does not apply to those countries.

See also 
Energy development
Energy security
Oil price increases since 2003
Oil reserves
World energy resources and consumption

References

Peak oil
Petroleum politics